Beatrice Taisamo is a Tanzanian actress.

Career
In the 2012 half-hour Swahili language TV Series, Siri ya Mtungi, made specially for Tanzania, she played the role of "Tula". Others featured include: Godliver Gordian, Yvonne Cherrie.

In another Swahili language film by Jordan Riber released in 2018 titled, Hadithi za Kumekucha: Fatuma, the main character, playing the role of "Fatuma". Also starred were Cathryn Credo and Ayoub Bombwe.

She was one of the eight African actresses nominated in the Best Actress in a Leading Actress category at the 2019 AMAA event, for her role in the film, Fatuma.

Filmatography

Accolades

References

External links
 Beatrice Taisamo on IMDb
 Beatrice Taisamo on Mubi

Tanzanian actresses
Living people
Year of birth missing (living people)